Calamotropha wallengreni is a moth in the family Crambidae. It was described by Stanisław Błeszyński in 1961. It is found in South Africa, where it has been recorded from KwaZulu-Natal and Gauteng.

References

Endemic moths of South Africa
Crambinae
Moths described in 1961